Vroman's Nose is a prominent geological feature in the town of Fulton (near Middleburgh), in Schoharie County, New York, United States. It is among the more popular hiking sites in upstate New York and is of significant historical note.

Discovery and naming

Vroman's Nose is a prominent landmark near the Schoharie Creek. The area was inhabited by Iroquois Indians before the coming of the British. Contrary to local belief, the mount was not inhabited by the natives due to a lack of a stable water supply.

When the British and Palatines arrived in the Schoharie Valley in the early eighteenth century, the land was ceded to the Vroman family by the British government. Since that time, the landmark has been known for its particular shape.

Revolutionary War

Vroman's nose served as a focal point in the struggle of the Schoharie Valley Patriots against the British Crown. The Lower Fort of the Valley was located under the shadow of the mount. It is also rumored that the hero of the battle of Saratoga, Timothy Murphy, spent much time at Vroman's Nose and in fact lived nearby.

A popular legend in Schoharie County is that Murphy once fell down Vroman's nose with two pitchers of milk but did not spill one drop. This is not true, as Murphy didn't fall; he jumped because he was being chased by Native Americans. Not spilling the milk, however, is considered true.

Present day

Plans were made to build a hotel on Vroman's nose in the 1930s, but were abandoned. Today, the mount is a prominent feature of Schoharie County. It is emblazoned on many seals and photographs. It has been named as a popular place for hiking, but camping is not permitted.

Vroman's Nose has also been a windfall for the study of geology in Upstate New York, being a sort of geologic anomaly.

Features

Vroman's Nose not only encompasses the basic easy and difficult trails, but also notes of interest. These include the summit, which is a large, flat surface left by glacial movements. This is called the "Dance Floor." There is also a location near the summit that may have been used by Patriot snipers during the Revolution. Vroman's Nose is a portion of the Long Path.

Vroman's nose is also near Bouck's Island, where the former governor of New York William C. Bouck once lived.

References

Mountains of Schoharie County, New York
Tourist attractions in Schoharie County, New York
Mountains of New York (state)